Joseph August Perano (10 October 1876 – 17 August 1951) was a New Zealand fisherman and whaler. He was born in Dunedin, Otago, New Zealand in 1876. He founded the last whaling station in New Zealand, and his sons were running the station in 1964 when the last whale was killed on the New Zealand coast. Perano Head, a headland in the Marlborough Sounds, is named for him.

References

1876 births
1951 deaths
New Zealand fishers
New Zealand people in whaling
Businesspeople from Dunedin